Bruce Carter may refer to:
 Bruce W. Carter (1950–1969), Vietnam War veteran and Medal of Honor recipient
 Bruce Carter (American football) (born 1988), American football linebacker
 Bruce Carter (businessman) (born 1959), South Australian businessman
 Bruce Carter (educator) (born 1939), Australian educator
 Bruce Carter (rower) (born 1943), British rower
 pseudonym for children's novels of Richard Hough, British writer